The 2019–20 Swiss Super League (referred to as the Raiffeisen Super League for sponsoring reasons) was the 123rd season of top-tier competitive football in Switzerland and the 17th under its current name and format.

A total of 10 teams competed in the league: the 9 best teams from the 2018–19 season and the 2018–19 Swiss Challenge League champions Servette. Young Boys were the defending champions. They successfully retained the title.

On 28 February Swiss Football League postponed all Super and Challenge League matches of matchdays 24, 25 and 26. Postponement came after the Swiss Federal Council banned all major events until 15 March due to the COVID-19 outbreak. On 13 March Super and Challenge League football was halted at least until the end of April; however, the season was resumed on 19 June.

Teams

Stadia and locations

Personnel and kits

Managerial changes

League table

Results

First and second round

Third and fourth round

Relegation play-offs
The ninth-placed team of 2019–20 Swiss Super League, Thun, played against the runners-up of 2019–20 Swiss Challenge League, Vaduz.

First leg

Second leg

Vaduz won 5–4 on aggregate and promoted to the Swiss Super League.

Season statistics

Top scorers

Top assists

Hat-tricks

Awards

Annual awards

References

External links
Official website

Swit
Swiss Super League seasons
2019–20 in Swiss football
Swiss Super League